Marco Zandron (born 30 September 1998) is an Italian-Spanish figure skater who currently represents Spain. With his skating partner, Laura Barquero, he is the 2021 CS Nebelhorn Trophy silver medalist and the 2021 Spanish national champion.

With his former partner, Federica Zamponi, competing for Italy, he is the 2020 Italian junior national silver medalist. As a single skater for Italy, he is the 2017 Egna Spring Trophy champion and competed on the ISU Junior Grand Prix circuit.

Personal life 
Zandron was born on September 30, 1998, in Bolzano, Italy. His older brother, Maurizio, competes for Austria in men's singles. As of September 2021, he is a student at the Università Cattolica del Sacro Cuore. Zandron became a Spanish citizen on December 29, 2021.

Career

Early career 
Zandron began learning how to skate in 2004 as a six-year-old. He began representing Italy internationally in men's singles at the novice level as early as 2010. He earned eight medals at international junior and senior B assignments throughout his career but was unable to achieve podium placement at the Italian Championships, therefore limiting his international assignment opportunities. He chose to end his singles career in December 2018 to focus on pair skating.

2018–2020: Partnership with Zamponi 
Zandron teamed up with his first pairs partner, Federica Zamponi, before the 2018–19 season. They placed third at the Italian junior national championships in their debut season. During the 2019–20 season, Zamponi/Zandron competed on the Junior Grand Prix circuit and won two international junior B medals: silver at the 2019 Egna Spring Trophy and gold at the 2019 Icelab International Cup. Before dissolving their partnership, they won the silver medal at the 2020 Italian junior championships.

2020–2021 season: Debut of Barquero/Zandron 
Zandron teamed up with Laura Barquero to compete for Spain in advance of the 2020–21 season, and in January 2021, they were formally cleared to represent Spain. They won the Spanish national title in their first outing together but did not compete internationally during the season.

2021–2022 season: Beijing Olympics
Barquero/Zandron made their international debut on the Challenger series at the 2021 Lombardia Trophy. They were second in the short program and won the free skate, taking the silver medal overall and finishing less than four points behind Italian national champions Della Monica/Guarise. They were next assigned to the 2021 CS Nebelhorn Trophy, attempting to qualify a berth for Spain at the 2022 Winter Olympics.  Third in the short program, they won the free skate despite two jump errors, taking the silver medal overall and the first of three pairs berths available at the event. This was the first time a Spanish pair qualified to the Winter Olympics. Barquero said she was "proud" of their work, while Zandron said he was confident that he would acquire Spanish citizenship in time to attend the Games. At their second Challenger, the 2021 CS Finlandia Trophy, they placed sixth with new personal bests in both segments and overall.

Zandron obtained his Spanish citizenship on December 29, 2021, making the team eligible to represent Spain at the Winter Olympics. In the new year, they competed together at their first European Championships, finishing in ninth place.Competing at the 2022 Winter Olympics in the pairs event, Barquero/Zandron were eleventh in the short program, receiving only a base level on their death spiral. Eleventh in the free skate as well; they finished eleventh overall.

On 22 February, the International Testing Agency reported that a sample taken from Barquero following the short program at the Olympics tested positive for a banned substance, a Clostebol metabolite. Her team suggested that the most likely source of the substance was the Trofodermin that she applied to a cut between her fingers caused by her skate blades during the short program. Due to Barquero's pending anti-doping case, Barquero/Zandron consequently were not entered for the 2022 World Championships scheduled for the end of March.

Programs

With Barquero

Competitive highlights 
CS: Challenger Series; JGP: Junior Grand Prix

Pairs with Barquero for Spain

Pairs with Zamponi for Italy

Detailed results 
Small medals for short and free programs awarded only at ISU Championships.

With Barquero for Spain

References

External links 
 

1998 births
Living people
Sportspeople from Bolzano
Spanish male pair skaters
Italian male pair skaters
Italian emigrants to Spain
Figure skaters at the 2022 Winter Olympics
Olympic figure skaters of Spain